The 2011–12 season was Forfar Athletic's second consecutive season in the Scottish Second Division, having been promoted from the Scottish Third Division at the end of the 2009–10 season. Forfar Athletic also competed in the Challenge Cup, League Cup and the Scottish Cup.

Summary
Forfar finished seventh in the Second Division. They reached the second round of the Challenge Cup, the second round of the League Cup and the fourth round of the Scottish Cup.

Results and fixtures

Pre-season

Scottish Second Division

Scottish Cup

Scottish League Cup

Scottish Challenge Cup

Player statistics

Squad 
Last updated 5 May 2012

|}

Disciplinary record
Includes all competitive matches.
Last updated 5 May 2012

Team statistics

League table

Transfers

Players in

Players out

References

Forfar Athletic
Forfar Athletic F.C. seasons